Alexander MacMillan (3 October 1818 – 25 January 1896), born in Irvine, Ayrshire, Scotland, was a cofounder, in 1843, with his brother Daniel, of Macmillan Publishers in London. His family were crofters from the Isle of Arran.

Alexander was the partner who developed the literary reputation of the company while Daniel took charge of the business and commercial side. Originally called Macmillan & Co., the firm started as a successful bookshop in Cambridge. The brothers soon started publishing books as well as selling them. After Daniel's death in 1857, Alexander continued to run the firm. He expanded the company into a worldwide organization and also started publishing magazines, including the prestigious scientific journal Nature.  Macmillan assigned George Edward Brett to create the New York office in August 1869 and hired American firm Messrs. Pott & Amery to assist in the marketing and distribution of Macmillan's books.

Alexander's brother Daniel was grandfather of Harold Macmillan, who became Prime Minister of the United Kingdom.

See also
Bowes & Bowes
Macmillan Publishing

References

Further reading
 Elizabeth James (2002) Macmillan: A Publishing Tradition   .
 Charles Morgan (1943) The House of Macmillan (1843–1943) Macmillan.

1818 births
1896 deaths
19th-century Scottish people
Scottish book publishers (people)
People from the Isle of Arran
People from Irvine, North Ayrshire
Alexander Macmillan
19th-century Scottish businesspeople